The Lebbeus Ford House is a historic house located on Jewett Hill Road in Berkshire, Tioga County, New York.

Description and history 
The house was built in about 1830, and is a two-story, five-bay wide, brick structure with a central hall plan, designed in a vernacular Federal style. It features an original entry with sidelights, elliptical louvered fan, and two-panel door.

It was listed on the National Register of Historic Places on July 2, 1984.

References

Houses on the National Register of Historic Places in New York (state)
Federal architecture in New York (state)
Houses completed in 1830
Houses in Tioga County, New York
1830 establishments in New York (state)
National Register of Historic Places in Tioga County, New York